St. Catherine's School is an independent Episcopal diocesan school in Richmond, Virginia, USA. It is the oldest private, all-girls school in Richmond and the only independent all-girls school in Virginia for age 3 to grade 12. St. Catherine's is the sister school to St. Christopher's. The school was listed on the National Register of Historic Places and the Virginia Landmarks Register in 2008.

History
St. Catherine's was founded in 1890 by Virginia Randolph Ellett during the middle of Richmond's New South movement.

In 1917, the school was incorporated and moved to its present site in the Westhampton area of Richmond. It was sold to the Episcopal Church in 1920 and renamed for St. Catherine, the patron saint of young women, especially those undergoing education. 

Since 1957, members of the graduated classes of St. Catherine's are invited to make their debut at the Bal du Bois, held annually at the Country Club of Virginia.

The school has produced at least three newspapers: The Scrap Basket, Odds 'n' Ends and Arcadian. The longest running being The Arcadian, which was published from 1940 to 2007.

Notable alumnae
 Adele Goodman Clark (1901), suffragette
Nancy Astor (1898), first female member of Parliament
Anna Hill Johnstone (1930), costume designer
Penny Williams (1955), Oklahoma State Senator
Molly Haskell (1957), film critic, author
Lee Smith (1963), author
 Charlotte Fox (1975), mountaineer
Dagen McDowell (1987), news anchor and analyst
Catharine F. Easterly (1988), judge of the District of Columbia Court of Appeals
 Tinsley Mortimer (1994), American socialite
 Darley Newman (1997), producer, TV host, writer 
 Anne H. Charity Hudley, linguist

References

External links

 Official web site

School buildings on the National Register of Historic Places in Virginia
National Register of Historic Places in Richmond, Virginia
Colonial Revival architecture in Virginia
School buildings completed in 1917
Preparatory schools in Virginia
Educational institutions established in 1890
Private K-12 schools in Virginia
Schools in Richmond, Virginia
Girls' schools in Virginia
Episcopal schools in Virginia
Historic districts on the National Register of Historic Places in Virginia
1917 establishments in Virginia